Alstonefield is a civil parish in the district of Staffordshire Moorlands, Staffordshire, England. It contains 56 listed buildings that are recorded in the National Heritage List for England. Of these, one is listed at Grade I, the highest of the three grades, three are at Grade II*, the middle grade, and the others are at Grade II, the lowest grade.  The parish contains the villages of Alstonefield and Stanshope, and the surrounding countryside.  Most of the listed buildings are houses and associated structures, cottages, and farmhouses, that are built in limestone with tile roofs.  The other listed buildings include a church and items in the churchyard, bridges, a public house, mileposts, a former watermill, and structures in the grounds of the former Beresford Hall.


Key

Buildings

References

Citations

Sources

Lists of listed buildings in Staffordshire